This One's Gonna Hurt You is the sixth studio album by American country music artist Marty Stuart, released on July 7, 1992 by MCA Nashville. It peaked at #12 on the Top Country Albums chart, and #6 on the Canadian albums chart. Four singles were released from it, "This One's Gonna Hurt You (For a Long, Long Time)", "Now That's Country", "High on a Mountain Top" and "Hey Baby". The album was certified Gold by the RIAA in the United States, and was certified Platinum in Canada. "Honky Tonk Crowd" was later released as a single by Rick Trevino from his self-titled album.

Track listing

Personnel
Flip Anderson - Hammond B-3 organ
Sam Bacco - chimes, percussion, timpani, vibraphone
Richard Bennett - 12-string electric guitar, 12-string acoustic guitar, acoustic guitar, electric guitar, mandolin, percussion, slide guitar
Joan Besen - piano
Johnny Cash - duet vocals on "Doin' My Time"
Ashley Cleveland - background vocals
Brad Davis - acoustic guitar
Stuart Duncan - fiddle
Paul Franklin - steel guitar, slide guitar
Josh Graves - Dobro
Vicki Hampton - background vocals
John Hughey - steel guitar, slide guitar
John Barlow Jarvis - organ, piano
Paul Kennerley - acoustic guitar, background vocals
Jana King - background vocals
Larry Marrs - bass guitar, background vocals
Carl Marsh - Fairlight, organ
Donna McElroy - background vocals
Lisa Silver - background vocals
Harry Stinson - drums, background vocals
Marty Stuart - acoustic guitar, electric guitar, mandolin, lead vocals
John Sturdivant Jr. - drums
Pam Tillis - background vocals
Travis Tritt - duet vocals on "This One's Gonna Hurt You (For A Long, Long Time)"
Dennis Wilson - background vocals

Chart performance

Album

Singles

References

External links
 This One's Gonna Hurt You album at CMT.com

Marty Stuart albums
1992 albums
MCA Records albums
Albums produced by Tony Brown (record producer)
Albums produced by Richard Bennett (guitarist)